The Judoon are a fictional extraterrestrial species of mercenary police from the British science fiction television programme Doctor Who and its spin-offs, first appearing in the Series 3 episode "Smith and Jones" (2007).

Depiction

Characteristics
Judoon are galactic police, brutal in their precise application of the law and highly logical in their battle tactics, but not very intelligent. In fact, the Doctor states that, whilst their behaviour is (on the surface) that of a military police force, they are really little more than "interplanetary thugs" for hire. They have no jurisdiction on Earth and no authority to deal with human crime (when hunting a fugitive alien in an Earth hospital, they transported the building to the Moon); they will, however, strictly obey any laws on the planet they are on (e.g. road speed limits). The Judoon carry energy weapons which can incinerate humans.

Judoon are upright-standing bipeds, with rhinoceros-like heads and only four digits on each hand: they wear black, bulky armour with heavy boots. According to the Doctor, the Judoon have a "great big lung reserve" which allows them to survive for extended periods in a limited oxygen environment. They have yellow blood.

History
In "Smith and Jones" (2007) in Series 3, the Tenth Doctor (David Tennant) had never encountered the race on-screen before, but during the episode he repeatedly demonstrates considerable knowledge of them and their methods. The Judoon used an H2O Scoop to bring a hospital which held the Doctor and Martha Jones (Freema Agyeman) to the Moon where the Judoon could apprehend a criminal (species Plasmavore), which disguised itself as Florence Finnegan (Anne Reid). The Judoon came in ships and landed on the moon, trying to find Finnigan with their scanners, but at first couldn't due to Finnigan assimilating human blood. However she was revealed when Finnigan took the Doctor's (a non-human) blood. They executed her for murdering an alien princess and afterwards transported the hospital back to Earth.

In Revenge of the Slitheen (2007), from the spin-off series The Sarah Jane Adventures, they were mentioned by the Slitheen, who said that the Intergalactic Police were after them.

In the novella Revenge of the Judoon (2008), where they seized Balmoral Castle in 1902 after being conned into a fraudulent mission, they made a deal with the Doctor that meant Earth was off-limits to them, something confirmed as canonical with the TV series by the BBC Monster Files feature. The Judoon are also mentioned in the Doctor Who Adventures comic "The Great Mordillo."

They appear in the Series 4 episode, "The Stolen Earth" (2008), as guards at the Shadow Proclamation. The TARDIS does not translate their language, because it is the universal law, like The Shadow Proclamation, and the Doctor replies in their language rather than in English. They only begin speaking English once he has introduced himself.

In The Sarah Jane Adventures Series 3-story, Prisoner of the Judoon (2009), Captain Tybo, a Judoon, crashes on Earth while his prisoner, Androvax the Annihilator, escapes, leaving Tybo hunting for him. He is knocked unconscious by Androvax and saved by Sarah Jane Smith (Elisabeth Sladen) and her companions, who helped him find Androvax who, as a veil form, has the ability to possess people; he uses this to possess Sarah Jane. Captain Tybo commandeers a London Metropolitan Police car and goes to Bannerman Road where he receives a call that more Judoon are coming. When Tybo and the gang go in they find that Sarah Jane has ordered her supercomputer Mr Smith (voiced by Alexander Armstrong) to explode in 60 seconds, but her adoptive son Luke Smith (Tommy Knight) stops him by reminding him that he is programmed to protect the planet. Tybo goes to the genetic system and regroups with the rest of the Judoon, finds Androvax and takes him back to the Shadow Proclamation. Despite the Judoon's nominal lack of jurisdiction on Earth, Tybo aggressively enforces English car radio volume limits and once points his gun at the driver of a nearby car whose music was too loud. Additionally, he and his colleagues summarily sentence Clyde Langer (Daniel Anthony) and Rani Chandra (Anjli Mohindra) to restriction to Earth as punishment for their interference.

Judoon are seen as part of an alliance of the Eleventh Doctor's (Matt Smith) enemies in the Series 5 episode, "The Pandorica Opens" (2010), who imprison him in the Pandorica beneath Stonehenge, believing he will destroy the universe. In the Series 6 episode, "A Good Man Goes to War" (2011), a small group of Judoon are recruited by the Doctor to join his army in the Battle of Demon's Run. Alongside Sontaran Commander Strax (Dan Starkey), a large battalion of Silurian warriors, and the newly space-pirating former crew of the Fancy, they help to apprehend Colonel Manton and his Cleric forces.

Individual Judoon are seen in a handful of other episodes: eyeing a Raxacoricofallapatorian in a Zagizalgul bar in "The End of Time" (2010); when Colony Sarff visits the Shadow Proclamation in "The Magician's Apprentice" (2015); and living in the trap street in "Face the Raven" (2015).

In "Fugitive of the Judoon" (2020) during the twelfth series, the Thirteenth Doctor (Jodie Whittaker) encountered the Judoon illegally searching Gloucester for a fugitive they were contracted to find. After the Judoon tracked their fugitive to the home of Ruth (Jo Martin) and Lee Clayton (Neil Stuke), the Doctor attempted to defuse the situation by escaping to Gloucester Cathedral with Ruth after Lee agreed to surrender himself to the Judoon. After Gat, a representative for the Judoon's contractor from Gallifrey, kills Lee, the Judoon track the Doctor and Ruth to the cathedral, where they discover that Ruth, later revealed to be a previously unknown, to the Thirteenth Doctor, incarnation of the Doctor disguised as a human using a Chameleon Arch, was the one they were hired to find after they decrypted her bio-shielding. After Ruth fends off and sends the Judoon back to their ship, the Judoon with the help of Gat find the Doctor's TARDIS, containing both Doctors, and use a tractor beam to bring it aboard. After Gat accidentally kills herself with a weapon tampered with by Ruth, Ruth and the Thirteenth Doctor leave the ship with the Judoon vowing to fulfill their contract.

At the end of "The Timeless Children" (2020), the Judoon's cold case unit arrested the Thirteenth Doctor and sent her to a maximum security facility for life imprisonment.

Appearances

Doctor Who
"Smith and Jones" (2007)
"Fugitive of the Judoon" (2020)

Cameos

"The Stolen Earth" (2008)
"The End of Time" (2010)
"The Pandorica Opens" (2010)
"A Good Man Goes to War" (2011)
"The Magician's Apprentice" (2015)
"Face the Raven" (2015)
"The Timeless Children" (2020)

The Sarah Jane Adventures
Prisoner of the Judoon (2009)

Audios
"Judoon in Chains" (2016)
"One Mile Down" (2019)

Novels
Revenge of the Judoon (New Series Adventures) by Terrance Dicks
Judgement of the Judoon (New Series Adventures) by Colin Brake
The Coming of the Terraphiles (New Series Adventures) by Michael Moorcock

Comic books
 Doctor Who – issues 3–6 (Fugitive)
 Doctor Who: The Forgotten – Issue 3 (Part Three: Misdirection) (featuring the Fifth Doctor, Tegan and Turlough)
 Doctor Who: The Prisoners of Time – Issue 4 (featuring the Fourth Doctor, K9 and Leela)
 ''Doctor Who: The 12th Doctor - Issues 3.9 - 3.12 (A Confusion of Angels) (featuring the Twelfth Doctor, Bill Potts, Nardole, the Weeping Angels and the Heavenly Host)

References

External links
 

Doctor Who races
Television characters introduced in 2007
Fictional characters with superhuman strength
Fictional extraterrestrial life forms
Fictional humanoids
Fictional rhinoceroses
Fictional police officers
Fictional warrior races
The Sarah Jane Adventures characters

fr:Liste des races non-humaines de la série Doctor Who#Judoon